Strettell is a surname. Notable people with this surname include:

Alma Strettell (1853-1939), British translator
Dashwood Strettell (1881–1958), British major-general
John Strettell (1721–1786), English merchant
Robert Strettell (1693–1762), city councilman and mayor of Philadelphia